The jazz minor scale is a derivative of the melodic minor scale, except only the ascending form of the scale is used. As the name implies, it is primarily used in jazz. It may be derived from the major scale with a minor third, making it a synthetic scale, and features a dominant seventh chord on the fifth degree (V) like the harmonic minor scale. 

Thus, the jazz minor scale can be represented by the following notation:

1, 2, 3, 4, 5, 6, 7, 8

The scale may be considered to originate in the use of extensions beginning with the seventh in jazz and thus the necessity to, "chromatically raise the diatonic 7th to create a stable, tonic sound," rather than use a minor seventh chord, associated with ii, for tonic.

The jazz minor scale contains all of the altered notes of the dominant seventh chord whose root is a semitone below the scale's tonic: "In other words to find the correct jazz minor scale for any dominant 7th chord simply use the scale whose tonic note is a half step higher than the root of the chord." For example, the G7 chord and A jazz minor scale: the A scale contains the root, third, seventh, and the four most common alterations of G7. This scale may be used to resolve to C in the progression G7–C (over G7, which need not be notated G75599).

It is used over a minor major seventh chord. See: chord-scale system. The scale also easily allows diatonic chord progressions, for example a I−vi−ii−V progression:
{|
|width="50px"| : CmM7 ||width="40px"| Am75 ||width="45px"|  Dm7 ||width="40px"| G713 || | : || 
|}
Its modes also include Lydian 5, Lydian 7, Locrian 2, and the altered scale.

Structure

Triad qualities 
The triads built on each scale degree follow a distinct pattern. The roman numeral analysis is shown in parentheses below.

 1st: minor triad (i)
 2nd: minor triad (ii)
 3rd: Augmented triad (III+)
 4th: Major triad (IV)
 5th: Major triad (V7)
 6th: diminished triad (vio)
 7th: diminished triad (viio)

Seventh chord qualities 
The seventh chords built on each scale degree follow a distinct pattern. The roman numeral analysis is shown in parentheses below.

 1st: minor-major seventh chord (i♮7)
 2nd: minor seventh chord (ii7)
 3rd: Augmented major seventh chord (III+7)
 4th: Dominant seventh chord (IV7)
 5th: Dominant seventh chord (V7)
 6th: half-diminished seventh chord (viø7)
 7th: half-diminished seventh chord (viiø7)

See also
Modes of the melodic minor scale
Harmonic minor scale
Natural minor scale
Major scale

References

Further reading
 R., Ken (2012). DOG EAR Tritone Substitution for Jazz Guitar, Amazon Digital Services, Inc., ASIN: B008FRWNIW

Heptatonic scales